The First Time is a 1952 American comedy-drama film directed by Frank Tashlin and starring Robert Cummings and Barbara Hale.

Plot
Expectant parents Joe and Betsy Bennett eagerly await the arrival of their new baby. After the baby arrives, they discover the other side of parenting: sleepless nights, mounting expenses and little free time.

Cast
 Robert Cummings as Joe Bennett
 Barbara Hale as Betsy Bennett
 Bill Goodwin as Mel Gilbert
 Jeff Donnell as Donna Gilbert
 Carl Benton Reid as Andrew Bennett
 Mona Barrie as Cassie Mayhew
 Kathleen Comegys as Florence Bennet
 Paul Harvey as Leeming
 Cora Witherspoon as Nurse Salisbury

Production
The film was originally called Small Wonder. It was produced by Halburt, the production company of Harold Hecht and Burt Lancaster, and was originally to have starred Larry Parks but he was unavailable because of possible future appearances before the House Un-American Activities Committee. Barbara Hale made her first appearance since giving birth to her son William Katt.

Filming started April 1951 and finished on June 4.

References

External links
 
 
 
 

1952 comedy-drama films
1952 directorial debut films
1952 films
American black-and-white films
American comedy-drama films
Columbia Pictures films
1950s English-language films
Films directed by Frank Tashlin
Films produced by Burt Lancaster
Films produced by Harold Hecht
Films scored by Friedrich Hollaender
Films with screenplays by Frank Tashlin
Norma Productions films
1950s American films